Chicken soup may refer to:

Chicken soup
Chicken Soup (TV series), 1989 series
"Chicken Soup", a 1976 song by Angel from Helluva Band
"Chicken Soup", a 1993 song by Saint Etienne from So Tough

See also
"The Ballad of Chicken Soup", a 1975 song by Carole King from Really Rosie musical soundtrack
Chicken Soup for the Soul, a 1993 book
1979 Cotton Bowl Classic, known as the Chicken Soup Game